Peter Müller (born 3 October 1946) is a retired East German football midfielder.

References

1946 births
Living people
East German footballers
Chemnitzer FC players
DDR-Oberliga players
Association football midfielders